Die Laughing is a 1980 American comedy-drama film released by Orion Pictures and starring Robby Benson.

Plot
A young cab driver and aspiring singer become embroiled in a plot to kidnap a monkey that has memorized a scientific formula with the potential to destroy the world.

Cast

References

External links
 
 
 
 

1980 films
1980 comedy-drama films
American comedy-drama films
Films scored by Craig Safan
Orion Pictures films
1980s English-language films
1980s American films